Homidia is a genus of springtails belonging to the family Entomobryidae. Species include:

Homidia allospila
Homidia amethystina
Homidia anhuiensis
Homidia chosonica
Homidia chrysothrix
Homidia cingula
Homidia emeiensis
Homidia fascia
Homidia flava
Homidia flavonigra
Homidia formosana
Homidia fujiyamai
Homidia glassa
Homidia grisea
Homidia haikea
Homidia heugsanica
Homidia hihiu
Homidia hjesanica
Homidia huashanensis
Homidia insularis
Homidia koreana
Homidia laha
Homidia latifolia
Homidia leei
Homidia mediaseta
Homidia minuta
Homidia munda
Homidia nigra
Homidia nigrocephala
Homidia obscura
Homidia pentachaeta
Homidia phjongjangica
Homidia polyseta
Homidia qimenensis
Homidia sauteri
Homidia similis
Homidia sinensis
Homidia socia
Homidia speciosa
Homidia subcingula
Homidia tiantaiensis
Homidia tibetensis
Homidia transitoria
Homidia vigintiseta
Homidia ziguiensis

References 

 Homidia at BioLib

Springtail genera